The Virginia–Virginia Tech football rivalry is an American college football rivalry between the Virginia Cavaliers football team of the University of Virginia (called Virginia in sports media and abbreviated UVA) and Virginia Tech Hokies football team of Virginia Polytechnic Institute and State University (called Virginia Tech and abbreviated VT). The two schools first met in 1895 and have played annually since 1970. The game counts for 1 point in the Commonwealth Clash each year, and is part of the greater Virginia–Virginia Tech rivalry.

Since 1990, the game has nearly always been held in late November, often on Thanksgiving weekend. The scheduling of this rivalry has taken the place of Virginia's South's Oldest Rivalry game versus North Carolina, which was played on Thanksgiving Day every year between 1910 and 1950 (save for when the programs disbanded during World War I). It has also taken the place of the VMI–Virginia Tech football rivalry which was held on Thanksgiving Day up through 1971. In 1964, the UVA–VPI game began alternating between Lane Stadium and Scott Stadium on the campuses of the two universities. Previously, the series was sometimes played in Richmond, Norfolk, and at Victory Stadium in Roanoke.

The rivalry has seen many streaks. Virginia started 8–0 in the series, outscoring VPI 175–5. The Cavaliers again went unbeaten (7–0–1) from 1945 to 1952, outscoring the Gobblers 267–47, with four shutouts. Soon after, UVA president Colgate Darden turned down an invite to the 1952 Orange Bowl and de-emphasized Virginia football (causing Art Guepe to leave the program). VPI then went 12–2 in games from 1953 to 1966. More recently, Virginia Tech won a series record 15 straight games in the rivalry from 2004–2018 before the Cavaliers defeated the Hokies in 2019.  

Virginia and Virginia Tech were both led by College Football Hall of Fame coaches in the 1980s and 1990s. George Welsh led UVA to a three-week run as the nation's AP No. 1 ranked team in 1990; shared ACC championships in 1989 and 1995; 85 ACC wins, second-most all-time (behind only Bobby Bowden); and an 8–6 record against Frank Beamer, a fellow Hall of Famer who led Virginia Tech to an appearance in a BCS National Championship Game; sole ACC championships in 2004, 2007, 2008, and 2010; four previous Big East Championships; and a dominant 14–1 record against Welsh's successors (Al Groh and Mike London). This rivalry game has three times served as a de facto Coastal Championship Game: in 2007 and 2011, won by Beamer's Hokies; and in 2019, won by Bronco Mendenhall's Cavaliers.

In the wake of the 2022 University of Virginia shooting, resulting in the death of 3 Virginia players, the 2022 edition was cancelled.

Commonwealth Cup Trophy 
In 1996, a trophy was created for the rivalry, known as the Commonwealth Cup. The winning team holds the trophy until the next game, which has been held annually since 1970. Currently, the Virginia Tech Hokies football team holds the cup, having won the 2021 edition of the contest. 

The trophy is constructed of marble and cherry wood, and is four feet high. It also contains the scores of all of the games in the series. The cup is engraved with the names of the two schools and is mounted atop a trapezoidal base that makes up most of the trophy's length. The front of the base features a stylized map of Virginia with Blacksburg and Charlottesville represented by stars on the map.'

History
The Virginia–Virginia Tech rivalry has existed since the 1890s, but did not reach pre-eminence until the 1980s. Traditionally, Virginia's primary rival had been the Tar Heels of the University of North Carolina at Chapel Hill, in a game which became known as the South's Oldest Rivalry. UVA and UNC had the most successful football programs of early Southern college football, as the name indicates: between 1889 and 1902, either Virginia or North Carolina claimed a southern championship in twelve out of fourteen years. VPI's rival was the Virginia Military Institute, with whom they shared a military tradition, geographic proximity, and similar acronyms (VMI and VPI).

The Virginia–VPI rivalry did have its heated moments, even early on. Hokie Hunter Carpenter, played nearly two full modern college football careers with Virginia Tech and the University of North Carolina. " The Cavalier Daily accused Carpenter of being paid, as he had played college football already for nearly a decade. Carpenter signed an affidavit that he had not received payment to play against UVA in any of the eight years (two of which he actually played for UNC in the South's Oldest Rivalry). After the VPI victory, Carpenter threatened to sue the UVA student paper for libel and UVA refused to play VPI again for eighteen years after, until 1923. Carpenter moved to Middletown, New York and never returned to the Commonwealth.

This rivalry game has been played in late November, often on Thanksgiving weekend, each year since 2000 and in every year but one (1999) since 1990. This was not always the case, as the aforementioned Virginia–Carolina and VPI–VMI rivalry games were played on Thanksgiving Day for much of the 20th century.

Memorable games

1995: Tech Comeback 
The Virginia Cavaliers came into the '95 contest looking for their ninth regular season win. Virginia led 29–14 going into the fourth quarter, however Virginia Tech then stormed back and a Jim Druckenmiller touchdown pass to Jermaine Holmes gave the Hokies the lead with forty seven seconds left. The Cavaliers' last attempt to win the game was then snuffed out when a Mike Groh pass was intercepted and taken to the endzone by Antonio Banks, who avoided a sideline trip by a UVA athletic trainer, Joe Gieck. The Hokies went on to the 1995 Sugar Bowl to defeat Texas, whereas Virginia went on to the 1995 Peach Bowl to defeat Georgia.

1998: Cavalier Revenge
Both teams entered the '98 matchup in ranked in the Top 25 and looking for their ninth win. Virginia Tech took no time jumping out in front. The Hokies took a 17–0 lead early and led at halftime 29–7. The Hoos then came out on fire and outscored the Hokies 29–3 in the second half. A now legendary touchdown pass from quarterback Aaron Brooks to Ahmad Hawkins put Virginia up by four, and a Wali Rainer interception preserved a Virginia comeback victory, arguably their most impressive win in Blacksburg. By erasing a 22-point deficit in the second half, the Cavalier victory made for the greatest comeback win of the long series by either program. As in 1995, Virginia again faced Georgia, and again in the Peach Bowl, but this time narrowly losing. Virginia Tech avenged their rivalry loss by easily defeating Alabama in the 1998 Music City Bowl.

2003: Wali's World
The Virginia Cavaliers entered the '03 Commonwealth Cup looking to snap a four game losing streak against the Hokies. Virginia Tech led 14–7 at the half, but Virginia came out in the second half firing on all cylinders, and outscored Tech 21–0 by the 14 minute mark in the fourth quarter. Up by seven with only a few minutes left, Virginia pulled off a fake field goal on fourth down to keep possession away from the Hokies. Wali Lundy ran in it for the score on the next play, capping a dominant performance of three rushing touchdowns and a receiving touchdown. Virginia held on to the win 35–21. This game also saw Matt Schaub tie Shawn Moore for all time passing touchdowns at Virginia. The Cavaliers went on to defeat Pittsburgh in the 2003 Continental Tire Bowl, while the Hokies went on to lose to California in the 2003 Insight Bowl.

2018: The Fumble Touchdown
The '18 rivalry game saw the first overtime game, and perhaps the most dramatic fourth quarter, thus far in the long series. Virginia had high hopes of ending the 14-game losing streak against a Tech team that had mostly limped through the season. But Virginia Tech led 14–0 at halftime, only to fall behind by a touchdown with only two minutes remaining. On the ensuing Tech drive, the Hokies drove to the redzone. Hokie running back Steven Peoples fumbled the ball inside the five-yard line but it was recovered by wide receiver Hezekiah Grimsley in the endzone for a touchdown. The game then went into overtime and the Hokies managed only a field goal. Virginia completed a pass to the Hokie 14 on their first play, but quarterback Bryce Perkins fumbled on the next, and it was recovered by the defense to end the game, with a most unlikely Virginia Tech victory that extended their winning streak to 15 and bowl streak to 26. Despite the rivalry loss, Virginia went on to defeat South Carolina in the 2018 Belk Bowl, while Virginia Tech lost to Cincinnati in the 2018 Military Bowl.

2019: Coastal Championship Game
No. 24 Virginia Tech (8–3) and unranked Virginia (8–3) were tied for first place in the Coastal Division with identical 5–2 ACC records coming into the game, making the traditional Thanksgiving weekend matchup a de facto Coastal Championship Game with the winner advancing to the 2019 ACC Championship Game against Clemson. The Hokies rolled into Charlottesville with a full head of steam, as quarterback Hendon Hooker was 6–0 as a starter and the Virginia Tech defense had just shut down Georgia Tech and Pittsburgh by the combined score of 73–0 in Bud Foster's final season. The Hokies had also won 15 consecutive games in the rivalry (including two previous division championship games in 2007 and 2011, by scores of 33-21 and 38-0 respectively) and were slight favorites to win again. But Virginia and quarterback Bryce Perkins had other plans. Perkins completed 20-of-33 passes for 311 yards and rushed for another 164, totaling 475 combined yards as a one-man wrecking crew against Foster's vaunted defense; Perkins set the tone early with a pair of long first-quarter touchdown runs. After a fourth quarter that easily rivaled the previous year's in intensity and excitement, Cavalier kicker Brian Delaney made a 48-yard field goal with 1:23 left in the game to give UVA a 33–30 lead. The Cavalier defensive line then sacked Hooker on three consecutive plays on the final meaningful drive of the game. On 3rd and 21, the Hokie quarterback fumbled in his own end zone after Mandy Alonso stripped the ball, which was recovered by fourth-year defensive lineman and Virginia native Eli Hanback with 1:01 left, effectively ending the game as more than 40,000 Wahoos shook Scott Stadium to its core. UVA's coaches had Perkins take a knee instead of kicking the point-after, to prevent a potential blocked-kick runback, providing for the final 39-30 margin. As time ran out on the final play and one last Hooker attempt fell incomplete in the end zone in front of the Cavalier student section, Virginia fans rushed the field as the Cavaliers ended their losing streak against the Hokies. With the win, UVA ended the season with a perfect 7–0 record at Scott Stadium. Virginia players had head coach Bronco Mendenhall "break the rock" with a sledgehammer after the game, an action traditionally reserved for the most valuable player as selected by his peers in Cavalier victories. Mendenhall thus became the first Virginia coach to bring both the Commonwealth Cup and Jefferson-Eppes Trophy to Charlottesville at the same time after earlier knocking off Florida State (with the team additionally winning the trophyless South's Oldest Rivalry). Virginia went on to lose to Florida in the 2019 Orange Bowl, while Virginia Tech lost to Kentucky in the 2019 Belk Bowl.

Game results

See also 
 List of NCAA college football rivalry games
 List of most-played college football series in NCAA Division I
 Virginia–Virginia Tech men's basketball rivalry

Notes

References

College football rivalries in the United States
College sports in Virginia
Virginia Cavaliers football
Virginia Tech Hokies football
1895 establishments in Virginia
Sports rivalries in Virginia